The 3 arrondissements of the Allier department are:
 Arrondissement of Montluçon, (subprefecture: Montluçon) with 89 communes.  The population of the arrondissement was 108,364 in 2016.
 Arrondissement of Moulins, (prefecture of the Allier department: Moulins) with 109 communes.  The population of the arrondissement was 106,124 in 2016.
 Arrondissement of Vichy, (subprefecture: Vichy) with 119 communes.  The population of the arrondissement was 124,896 in 2016.

History

In 1800 the arrondissements of Moulins, Gannat, Lapalisse and Montluçon were established. The arrondissement of Gannat was disbanded in 1926. In 1941 Vichy replaced Lapalisse as subprefecture. 

The borders of the arrondissements of Allier were modified in January 2017:
 14 communes from the arrondissement of Montluçon to the arrondissement of Vichy
 three communes from the arrondissement of Moulins to the arrondissement of Vichy
 one commune from the arrondissement of Vichy to the arrondissement of Moulins

References

Allier